A. Hosahalli  is a village in the southern state of Karnataka, India. It is located in the Turuvekere taluk of Tumkur district in Karnataka.

See also
 Tumakuru
 Districts of Karnataka

References

External links
  A. Hosahalli as per Government of India Website.

Villages in Tumkur district